David Popovici (born 15 September 2004) is a Romanian competitive swimmer who specializes in freestyle events. He is the current holder of the world record in the long course 100-metre freestyle and the junior world record in the long course 200-metre freestyle. He also holds the junior world record in the short course 100-metre freestyle. At the 2022 World Aquatics Championships, Popovici won gold medals in his two signature events (Men's 100-metre freestyle and Men's 200-metre freestyle), becoming the first swimmer to do so at the same edition of the World Championships, since Jim Montgomery in 1973. Following his performances during the 2022 long course season, in which he won eleven gold medals and two silver medals, Popovici was voted Male Swimmer of the Year by both SwimSwam and Swimming World Magazine. During that summer, he established an unprecedented level of dominance, especially in the long course 100-metre freestyle, recording 13 of the 19-fastest swims in the world in 2022, while also becoming only the third swimmer in history to set an under 1:43 time in the long course 200-metre freestyle.

Early life
Popovici was born in Bucharest, and he started swimming at Lia Manoliu pool at the age of 4, at a doctor's recommendation to correct early stage scoliosis. At the age of 9 he began to train at Aqua Team Bucharest, under coach Adrian Rădulescu, a former swimmer with a PhD in athletic performance specialized in swimming. At the age of 10, Popovici broke his first junior national record, in 50 m backstroke – a 24 year-old record held by Dragoș Coman, a 2003 world bronze medalist. At 14 he became the fastest swimmer under 15 in the history of the European Youth Olympic Festival, swimming 100 meters in 49.82 seconds.

Swimming career

2021: Olympic debut

2020 European Championships
At the 2020 European Aquatics Championships in Budapest, which took place from 10 to 23 May 2021 due to the COVID-19 pandemic, Popovici managed to swim below the Olympic Qualifying Time in the Men's 100-metre freestyle event and by doing so, he qualified for the Tokyo 2020 Olympics, being the youngest member of the Romanian team. He broke the Romanian national record three times during the event (in the heats, semifinal and final), finishing sixth place in the final. Popovici also competed in the  Men's 50-metre freestyle and the Men's 200-metre freestyle, meeting the Olympic Selection Time in both of the events.

2021 European Junior Championships

Popovici won a total of four medals, at the 2021 European Junior Swimming Championships in Rome, where he broke the 100-metre freestyle junior world record twice, and the 200-metre freestyle junior world record once. In the 4x100-metre freestyle relay, he broke the junior world record for the first time, with a time of 47.56, helping the relay win the silver medal. Two days later, he managed to break the same junior world record again, this time in the 100-metre freestyle event, to win the gold medal, with a time of 47.30. This performance made Popovici the fastest man in the world at that time in 2021, surpassing Kliment Kolesnikov. His second gold medal of the European Junior Championships came in the 200-metre freestyle event, where he broke another junior world record in the semifinal, with a time of 1:45.26. He won his third gold medal in the 50-metre freestyle event, where he finished 0.61 seconds ahead of second place finisher Nikita Chernousov.

2020 Summer Olympics
At the 2020 Summer Olympics in Tokyo, which were postponed to 2021 due to the COVID-19 pandemic, Popovici competed in the 50-metre, 100-metre, and 200-metre freestyle individual events, following his good performances at the European Championships. While he did not win a medal, he was only 0.02 seconds behind bronze medalist Fernando Scheffer, and ahead of Martin Malyutin (who won the gold medal at the European Championships), as he finished fourth in the Men's 200-metre freestyle, with a time of 1:44.68. In the Men's 100-metre freestyle, Popovici once again asserted himself as a medal contender, qualifying for the final (47.72) and ultimately placing seventh, with a time of 48.04.

2021 European Short Course Championships

To follow-up a pair of national records accomplished while racing at the FINA World Cup meet in Kazan, clocking respective performances of 46.77 in the 100-metre freestyle, and 1:43.58 in the 200-metre freestyle, Popovici entered to compete at the 2021 European Short Course Swimming Championships held at the Kazan Aquatics Palace in Russia. On 6 November, Popovici won the gold medal in the Men's 200-metre freestyle event, with a time of 1:42.12, breaking his own national record from the World Cup. He failed to qualify for the finals in the Men's 100-metre freestyle, and Men's 400-metre freestyle individual events.

2021 World Short Course Championships
In his first of two events at the 2021 World Short Course Championships, the 400-metre freestyle on 16 December, Popovici placed thirty-second with a time of 3:46.08 and did not qualify for the evening final. For his second event, the 200-metre freestyle the following day, he ranked fourteenth in the preliminary heats with a 1:43.62, not qualifying for the final of the event.

2022: Double world champion and world record holder at seventeen

2022 World Championships

At the 2022 World Championships, Popovici won gold medals in the Men's 100-metre freestyle and the Men's 200-metre freestyle, becoming the first swimmer in 49 years to win gold in both sprint events, at the same edition of the world championships.  Popovici dominated throughout the heats, semifinals and final of the 200-metre freestyle event, firstly clocking a personal best 1:44.40 in the semifinal, to take the top seed and break a world junior record. In the final, on 20 June, he finished 1.26 seconds ahead of his closest competitor, Hwang Sun-woo, touching the wall at 1:43.21 to become the fourth fastest performer of all-time (second fastest performer of all-time in a textile swimsuit) and win the gold medal. This performance made Popovici the second-youngest swimmer to win the Men's 200-metre freestyle event at the world championships (following Tim Shaw), at only 17 years and 278 days old. On Day 4, in the semifinal of the 100-metre freestyle, Popovici broke his third world junior record in as many days by clocking a 47.13, heading into the final as the top seed by nearly half a second. On the next day, in the final, he managed to win his second gold medal, touching at 47.58 for a come-from-behind victory, just .06 ahead of France's Maxime Grousset.

2022 European Junior Championships

At the 2022 European Junior Championships in Otopeni, Popovici competed in five individual and relay events, winning either gold or silver in all five of them, and helping his compatriots to what was going to be Romania's most successful European Junior Championships. Matching his individual performances in Rome from last year, he won the gold medal in the Men's 50-metre, 100-metre, and 200-metre freestyle events, most notably winning the 200-metre freestyle final with a time of 1:45.45, which was 2.26 seconds ahead of silver medalist Lorenzo Galossi. On 5 July, Popovici led off the Romanian Men’s 4×100 freestyle relay in 47.54, as the quartet composed of himself, Vlad Stancu, Ștefan Cozma and Patrick Dinu won gold in front of a home crowd, with a time of 3:18.93. One day later, on 6 July, Popovici was part of the Romanian relay that won the silver medal in the Mixed 4x100-metre freestyle, along with Patrick Dinu, Bianca Costea, and Rebecca Diaconescu.

2022 European Championships

Popovici kept his momentum rolling from the world championships into Rome, where he entered to compete at the 2022 European Aquatics Championships. His meet started with the 100-metre freestyle, where in the prelims he clocked a new championship record of 47.20. He followed that up with a 46.98 performance in the semifinals, setting a new world junior record and European record. Furthermore, his closing split in the semifinals (24.05), became the fastest in the history of the event at that time.  On 13 August 2022, Popovici one-upped himself in the final, touching at 46.86 to not only win gold, but break César Cielo's 13-year-old world record in the event, by 0.05 seconds. The Romanian was not leading at the halfway mark of the race, opening in 22.74 and trailing Maxime Grousset with fifty meters left to go. However, he came home in a scintillating 24.12 final fifty, and ended up winning 0.61 seconds ahead of his closest competitor. Following his performances in the semifinals and the final, Popovici became the first swimmer to crack the 47-second mark two times. On 14 August, he once again proved he was in top form in the 200-metre freestyle event, moving through the prelims and the semifinals easily, and dropping the hammer in the final the following day, clocking a new world junior record of 1:42.97, to win his second gold medal. This performance made him the fastest textile performer in the history of the event and third fastest all-time behind Michael Phelps and world record holder Paul Biedermann. On 17 August, Popovici swum in the heats of the Men's 400-metre freestyle event, clocking a personal best of 3:47.99, but later withdrew from the final. Following the conclusion of the competition, LEN, the official governing body of European Aquatics, announced that David Popovici was named the male swimmer of the meet, as his performances earned him the highest number of FINA points during the championships.

2022 World Junior Championships

Two weeks before his eighteenth birthday, Popovici competed at the 2022 World Junior Championships in Lima, in his final long course international competition as a junior athlete. On the first day, 30 August, Popovici helped the Romanian relay to a gold medal in the Men's 4x100-metre freestyle event, finishing 1.45 seconds ahead of the French relay that won the silver medal. He twice lowered the FINA World Junior Championship Record in the 100-metre freestyle; first by leading off the relay in prelims, and then again in the final. The next day, he managed to do the same in the 200-metre freestyle, as he captured the gold medal, covering his four laps in a champion-record mark of 1:46.18. Popovici ended up touching the wall almost three seconds before silver medalist Dániel Mészáros, who was timed in 1:48.98. On 1 September, the Romanian relay featuring Popovici on the leadoff leg, won the silver medal in the Mixed 4x100-metre freestyle event, with a time of 3:30.39, finishing 0.36 seconds behind the Hungarian relay. In his final event, Popovici swam in the 100-metre freestyle, winning his third gold medal, with a time of 47.13, 2.24 seconds ahead of silver medalist Jere Hribar.

2022 World Short Course Championships

On day two of the 2022 World Short Course Championships in Melbourne, Australia, Popovici set a new world junior record in the semifinals of the 100-metre freestyle with a time of 45.91 seconds, which was 0.20 seconds faster than the former mark of 46.11 by Kliment Kolesnikov. The following day, he placed thirty-first in the 400-metre freestyle with a time of 3:58.48. In the final of the 100 metre freestyle, he set another world junior record with a personal best time of 45.64 seconds and placed fourth. His performances in the 100-metre freestyle made him the first junior swimmer in history to go under 46 seconds in the event. The sixth and final day, he won the silver medal in the 200-metre freestyle with a new Romanian record time of 1:40.79.

Personal life 
Popovici grew up idolizing  Michael Phelps and Ian Thorpe. He also stated that he is inspired by Floyd Mayweather, following Mayweather's training methods and the way he motivated himself. In December 2021, Popovici signed an endorsement deal with Arena.

In July 2022, Popovici was awarded the Order of the Star of Romania, the highest civil order in the nation, by the Romanian president Klaus Iohannis.

Personal bests

Long course metres (50 m pool)

Short course metres (25 m pool)

Records

World records

Long course metres (50 m pool)

Continental records

Long course metres (50 m pool)

World junior records

Long course metres (50 m pool)

Short course metres (25 m pool)

Awards
 Swimming World, Swimmer of the Year (male): 2022
 Swimming World, Newcomer of the Year: 2021
 SwimSwam Swammy Award Male Swimmer of the Year: 2022
 SwimSwam Swammy Award European Male Swimmer of the Year: 2022
 SwimSwam Swammy Award World Junior Male Swimmer of the Year: 2022
 SwimSwam, Top 100 (Men's): 2022 (#20), 2023 (#3)
 LEN Award, European Male Swimmer of the Year: 2022
 Gazeta Sporturilor, Romanian Athlete of the Year: 2022
 BTA, Balkan Athlete of the Year: 2022
 Piotr Nurowski Award: 2021

References

External links

 
 Official Website

 

2004 births
Living people
Sportspeople from Bucharest
Romanian male freestyle swimmers
Swimmers at the 2020 Summer Olympics
Olympic swimmers of Romania
World Aquatics Championships medalists in swimming
Medalists at the FINA World Swimming Championships (25 m)
European Aquatics Championships medalists in swimming
21st-century Romanian people